Henry Beaumont Coles (1794 – 23 November 1862) was a British Conservative politician.

Coles was first elected MP for Andover in 1847, but lost the seat in 1857. He was then elected MP for the seat again at a by-election in 1861 but died the following year.

References

External links
 

UK MPs 1847–1852
UK MPs 1852–1857
UK MPs 1859–1865
1794 births
1862 deaths
Conservative Party (UK) MPs for English constituencies